Sayf ad-Din Tatar (d. 30 November 1421) was a Mamluk sultan of Egypt from 29 August to 30 November 1421.

Family
One of his wives was the daughter of Qutlubugha Hajji al-Banaqusi al-Turkmani al-Halabi. They together had one daughter, Khawand Fatima, who married Sultan Barsbay, and died on 30 August 1469. Another wife was the daughter of Sudun al-Faqih. Another wife was Khawand Sa'adat. She was the daughter of Sirghitmish, and had been previously married to Sultan Al-Mu'ayyad Shaykh. They married on 4 August 1421. She died in 1430. He had one son, An-Nasir ad-Din Muhammad, who reigned between 1421 and 1422. Another daughter was Sitt al-Muluk. She was married to Yashbak as-Suduni, the commander-in-chief.

References

Burji sultans
15th-century Mamluk sultans
1421 deaths
Year of birth unknown